Benghazi Cathedral is a former Roman Catholic church in the city of Benghazi, Libya. It is located in the city center.

History
Benghazi Cathedral, dedicated to the Holy Name of Jesus, was built between 1929 and 1939 on land formerly occupied by Arabs, and was one of the largest churches in North Africa. It was designed by the Italian architects Ottavio Cabiati and Guido Ferrazza. It was lightly damaged when Benghazi was captured by the Wehrmacht during Operation Sonnenblume. Soon after King Idris took power in 1951, the building was slowly abandoned due to lack of maintenance. After Muamar Gadaffi took power and suppressed the Libyan Church, plans were made to convert the building into a Mosque, as with the Cathedral of Tripoli, but the cathedral's position prevented Imams from facing Mecca, and the plans were scrapped. The building was later used as a headquarters for the Arab Socialist Union.

The Headquarters had already been abandoned by time of the Libyan Civil War, following several unsuccessful restoration efforts. The Cathedral survived the Battle of Benghazi (2014–2017) without major structural damage.

As of 2020, the cathedral is still abandoned.

Architectural features 
The building is an example of Neoclassical architecture, and was designed by Italian architects Ottavio Cabiati and Guido Ferrazza. The cathedral's architecture is based on that of a basilica. The entrance has a portico with four Doric columns and two side pillars. Its two characteristic domes cover both spans of the nave, while a series of oculi provide the cathedral's lighting. The building is heavily inspired by Italian religious architecture. Original plans show that the cathedral was not completed as planned; the designs included a three-story bell tower and sumptuous ceiling decoration, neither of which were built. It is nonetheless one of the largest churches in North Africa.

See also
Catholic Church in Libya

References 

Buildings and structures in Benghazi
Roman Catholic churches completed in 1939
Former Roman Catholic churches in Libya
Roman Catholic cathedrals in Libya
20th-century Roman Catholic church buildings